Stig Berntsson (19 October 1930 – 24 March 2011) was a Swedish sports shooter. He competed at the 1960 Summer Olympics, 1964 Summer Olympics and the 1968 Summer Olympics. His greatest run was at the 1960 Olympics, where he scored #11 in Shooting.

References

External links
 

1930 births
2011 deaths
Swedish male sport shooters
Olympic shooters of Sweden
Shooters at the 1960 Summer Olympics
Shooters at the 1964 Summer Olympics
Shooters at the 1968 Summer Olympics
Sportspeople from Gothenburg